Triplophysa eugeniae is a species of ray-finned fish in the genus Triplophysa.

Footnotes 
 

eugeniae
Taxa named by Artem Mikhailovich Prokofiev
Fish described in 2002